István Koczka (born 22 July 1958) is a Hungarian former swimmer. He competed in two events at the 1976 Summer Olympics.

References

1958 births
Living people
Hungarian male swimmers
Olympic swimmers of Hungary
Swimmers at the 1976 Summer Olympics
Sportspeople from Budapest
20th-century Hungarian people
21st-century Hungarian people